The Bet-Nahrain Democratic Party, usually abbreviated as BNDP is an Assyrian political party in Iraq led by Romeo Nissan Hakkari. One of the party's goals is to create an autonomous Assyrian Administrative Region within the Assyrian homeland.

History 

The BNDP was founded on the 21st of March 1974 as a union between the Bet-Nahrain Organization in California headed by Sargon Dadesho, and the Quest Movement in Chicago headed by notable individuals such as Gilyana Yonan.

BNDP was influential in the development of the Assyrian flag in 1968 alongside the Assyrian Universal Alliance and the Assyrian National Federation.

BNDP contested the 2005 Kurdistan Region parliamentary election as part of the ruling Democratic Patriotic Alliance of Kurdistan and were allocated one seat for Romeo Hakkari. It also contested the January 2005 Iraqi legislative election as part of the Kurdish alliance, and Goriel Mineso Khamis was allocated one seat in the Council of Representatives of Iraq.

It did not participate in the Iraqi legislative election of December 2005

In the Iraqi governorate elections of 2009, the BNDP allied itself with the Chaldean Syriac Assyrian Popular Council in the Ishtar Patriotic List. The list won two seats in Baghdad and Ninawa, including BNDP member Giwargis Esho Sada in Baghdad.

On the 6th of January 2015, the BNDP and Bet-Nahrain Patriotic Union announced the formation of the Nineveh Plain Forces to protect the people of the Nineveh Plain and maintain control of the region for people that want to return to the area.

United States 

The party is active among Assyrian Americans in California, where it runs the KBSV (Assyria Vision) television station, and the KBES radio station.

In 1983 the party set up the "Assyrian National Congress" with the "Assyrian American Leadership Council". In 2002 they entered into an alliance with the Free Officers Movement of exiled military officers led by Najib al-Salhi.

See also 

 Dawronoye
 Nineveh Plain Forces

References

External links
Party website

Assyrian political parties
Political parties in Kurdistan Region
Political parties of minorities in Iraq
Organizations of the 1991 uprisings in Iraq
Assyrians in Iraq
Political parties established in 1974
Ethnic political parties
1974 establishments in Iraq